Anton D. Justin Sealey II (born November 19, 1991 in Nassau, Bahamas) is a Bahamian retired footballer who played college soccer for the University of North Carolina and the University of Central Florida. He is currently the president of the Bahamas Football Association.

Club career
Sealey transferred to the University of Central Florida for the 2012 school year and also plays in the USL Premier Development League for Orlando City U-23.

International career
He made his international debut for the Bahamas in a July 2011 FIFA World Cup qualification match against the Turks and Caicos Islands and has, as of April 2016, earned a total of 3 caps, scoring no goals. All of his caps were won in FIFA World Cup qualification matches.

References

External links
 

1991 births
Living people
Sportspeople from Nassau, Bahamas
Association football central defenders
Bahamian footballers
Bahamas international footballers
North Carolina Tar Heels men's soccer players
UCF Knights men's soccer players
Reading United A.C. players
Orlando City U-23 players
Bahamian expatriate footballers
Expatriate soccer players in the United States
USL League Two players
Bahamian expatriate sportspeople in the United States
Bahamas youth international footballers